I B Memorial Institute (IBMI) is an English-medium co-ed school located at South Garia, Kolkata, India. The school offers education up to 10th standard.. The school is affiliated to the West Bengal Board of Secondary Education [WBBSE].

References 

High schools and secondary schools in West Bengal
Schools in Kolkata
Educational institutions in India with year of establishment missing